Anacleora is a genus of moths in the family Geometridae. The genus was first described by Anthonie Johannes Theodorus Janse in 1932.

Species
Anacleora pulverosa Warren, 1904
Anacleora extremaria Walker, 1860
Anacleora diffusa Walker, 1869

References

Ennominae
Geometridae genera